Beautiful Freak is the debut album by American rock band Eels. It was released on 13 August 1996 and is the first album released by record label DreamWorks.

Background
Beautiful Freak is largely the solo work of musician Mark Oliver Everett. It is his first album using the full band name Eels, in an attempt to get the records in the same general location in the stores as his previous works under the name "E".

Recording
Beautiful Freak was produced by E, Jon Brion, Mark Goldenberg and Michael Simpson. The majority of the album was recorded from 1993 to 1995, with first single "Novocaine for the Soul" having been recorded and mixed as early as 1993.
"Susan's House" contains a sample of "Love Finds Its Own Way" by Gladys Knight & the Pips; "Guest List" contains a sample of "I Like It" by The Emotions; and "Flower" contains sample of "I'm Glad You're Mine" by Al Green.

Artwork
Everett had suggested having a little girl with big eyes on the cover. The girl that came in to have her picture taken incidentally looked "like a miniature Susan" to Everett, referring to his ex-girlfriend and the subject of the song "Susan's House".

Release 
Beautiful Freak was released on August 13, 1996, by record label DreamWorks, the first album released on the label. The album peaked at number 5 on the UK Albums Chart.

Four singles were released to promote the album: "Novocaine for the Soul" in February 1996, "Susan's House" in May, "Your Lucky Day in Hell" in September, and the title track the following year.

The April 1997 German release of the album included a bonus live EP from a BBC recording session.

Reception 

In a contemporary review of Beautiful Freak, Q praised the album as "a complete musical vision, a genre-spanning soundscape that reels you in with its myriad hooks". Robert Hilburn of the Los Angeles Times wrote that "Eels' maverick vision reminds you of all the great Los Angeles bands, from the Flying Burrito Brothers to X, that have chronicled the outsider, underdog attitude in the shadows of a record industry that never embraces them commercially." Ethan Smith of Entertainment Weekly stated that "the Eels' postgrunge pop melodies and quirky, intelligent production make for catchy modern rock that's miles ahead of the competition", but felt that E's "attempts at warts-and-all portrayals of urban life come off as a disingenuous, arty pose" and that "a little less pretension would get these guys a lot further." Chicago Tribune critic Mark Caro was less favorable, writing that E's lyrics paint him as "either naive and self-absorbed or patronizing and calculating". The Village Voices Robert Christgau assigned the album a "dud" rating, indicating "a bad record whose details rarely merit further thought."

In his retrospective review, James Chrispell of AllMusic wrote: "Concise pop tunes form the backbone of the album, yet tinges of despair and downright meanness surface just when you've been lulled into thinking this is another pop group". Trouser Press wrote that "E's material works best when he finds the rare balance between his misanthropy and his capacity for warmth."

Legacy

It was voted number 666 in the third edition of Colin Larkin's All Time Top 1000 Albums (2000). The album was included in the book 1001 Albums You Must Hear Before You Die.

Track listing

Personnel 

Eels
 Butch – drums, backing vocals, production, engineering
 E – vocals, guitar, Wurlitzer electric piano, production, engineering
 Tommy Walter – bass guitar, backing vocals

Additional musicians
 Jon Brion – guitar, trombone, Chamberlin
 Mark Goldenberg – guitar, keyboards, production, engineering
 Jim Jacobsen – keyboards, loops, engineering
 Paul Edge – turntables

Technical
 Michael Simpson – production, mixing
 Jon Brion – production, engineering
 Amir Derakh – engineering
 Matt Thorne – engineering
 Billy Kinsley – mixing
 Rob Seifert – mixing
 Stephen Marcussen – mastering
 Ann Giordano – photography
 Francesca Restrepo – art direction, sleeve design

Charts

Weekly charts

Year-end charts

Certifications and sales

References

External links 

 

1996 debut albums
Albums produced by Jon Brion
DreamWorks Records albums
Eels (band) albums
Albums produced by Mark Oliver Everett